The National Archives of Australia (NAA), formerly known as the Commonwealth Archives Office and Australian Archives, is an Australian Government agency that serves as the national archives of the nation. It collects, preserves and encourages access to important Commonwealth government records.

The NAA also develops exhibitions, publishes books and guides to the collection, and delivers educational programs.

History
After World War I the Commonwealth National Library (later National Library of Australia) was responsible for collecting Australian Government records. The library appointed its first archives officer in 1944.

In March 1961 the Commonwealth Archives Office formally separated from the National Library of Australia and was renamed as the Australian Archives in 1975.

In 1966, Peter Scott of the Commonwealth Archives Office developed the Australian Series System (aka Commonwealth Records Series System). This system represented a change in traditional archival theories of provenance, and it caters for changes of name and provides a flexible framework to arrange records across the different agencies which share the same organisational content.

The Archives Act 1983 gave legislative protection to Commonwealth government records for the first time, with the Australian Archives responsible for their preservation.

The agency was renamed the National Archives of Australia in February 1998.

Function
Under the Act, the National Archives has two main roles:
 to collect and preserve Australia's most valuable government records and encourage their use by the public
 to promote good information management by Commonwealth government agencies, especially in meeting the challenges of the digital age.

Facilities
The Archives' National Office is in Canberra.

In 1998 the Canberra reading room, galleries and public areas of National Archives moved into a heritage-listed building known as "East Block" in the Parliamentary Triangle. The building, one of the national capital's original offices, was built in 1926 beside the Provisional Parliament House. Over the years East Block housed various government departments and served as Canberra's first post office and telephone exchange.

On Friday, 9 June 2017 (International Archives Day), the National Archives of Australia officially opened the new, purpose-built National Archives Preservation Facility in Canberra, separate from the National Office which houses the reading room and galleries. On 21 September 2018, the National Archives Preservation Facility was officially renamed the Peter Durack Building after the Hon Peter Durack QC, who introduced the bill creating Australia's National Archives in 1983.

In addition to the National Office of Canberra in the Australian Capital Territory (ACT), the National Archives has offices and reading rooms in the capital city of each state and the Northern Territory:
 South Australia - Adelaide
 Queensland - Brisbane
 Northern Territory - Darwin
 Tasmania - Hobart
 Victoria - Melbourne
 Western Australia - Perth
 New South Wales - Sydney

Collections

The National Archives of Australia's collection of 40 million items covers records pertaining to the government of Australia, including Federation, Governors-General, Prime Ministers, Cabinet and Ministers.

Among the most popular with the public are defence service and immigration records which often contain valuable family history.

The Archives' repositories are not open to the public but items can be requested for digitisation or for viewing in reading rooms. Most records over 26 years old (gradually reducing to 20 years) are released for public access on request. However some have certain information exempted from access. These exemptions may include documents relating to defence and security and sensitive personal information.

Cabinet notebooks have a longer closed period, gradually decreasing from 50 to 30 years by 2021. Access to items of cultural sensitivity to Indigenous Australians may also be restricted.

There are several notable collections held by the National Archives of Australia, including:
 founding documents, including the Royal Commission of Assent, the Constitution Act and other records created when the six colonies federated to create the Commonwealth of Australia on 1 January 1901
 World War I and World War II service records. Some 376,000 service records for men and women who served in World War I have been digitised and are available online at the Discovering Anzacs website.
 the Griffin drawings – Walter Burley Griffin and Marion Mahony Griffin's winning entry for the design of Australia's federal capital
 Mildenhall glass plate photographs taken by government photographer Jack Mildenhall – the 7700 images record Canberra during the 1920s and 1930s
 more than 34,000 immigration photographs
 copyright, patent and trademark registration records

Recent modernisation efforts and collaborations

"Discovering Anzacs" digital partnership
In 2014, the National Archives of Australia, in partnership with Archives New Zealand, created the digital repository Discovering Anzacs to commemorate the centenary of World War I and each nation's role in the war effort at home and abroad. The repository features the complete and fully digitised service records of the Australian and New Zealand Army Corps (ANZAC). Service records are also displayed geographically on a map of the world to indicate each individual's place of birth, enlistment, death and burial. Users are encouraged to transcribe the official records to improve access and add personal comments, photos and stories to give greater context to each record.

Diversity initiatives 
In 2014, the National Archives of Australia announced its Reconciliation Action Plan (RAP) to foster better relations with its Indigenous population, the Aboriginal and Torres Strait Islander peoples. The RAP is a multifaceted approach to drawing attention to the history of Aboriginal and Torres Strait Islander peoples, engaging and illustrating their culture respectfully, and providing improved access to their historical records. A main feature of this initiative is the Bringing Them Home name index, which leverages the National Archives' collection of records to facilitate genealogical research for Aboriginal and Torres Strait Islander peoples. The National Archives also seeks to have 3 percent of their workforce as Indigenous.

Digital initiatives

Digital Continuity 2020 
On 27 October 2015, the National Archives of Australia announced its Digital Continuity 2020 program to modernise the information management practices of the government for the digital age. The policies of Digital Continuity 2020 issued by the authority of the National Archives apply to the whole of the Australian Government and seek to improve efficiency and access of all services.

Deadline 2025 
"Deadline 2025" is a collaboration between the National Archives of Australia and the National Film and Sound Archive to prioritise digitisation of valuable audio-visual media stored on magnetic tape which may deteriorate to the point of being unusable by 2025.

In March 2021, a review of the National Archives commissioned by the government found that only six per cent of the collection would be able to be digitised by 2025 with the current resource levels, and recommended that the government spend  on a program to digitise the content most at risk of deterioration within the following seven years. The footage includes recordings from the Royal Commission into Aboriginal Deaths in Custody, ASIO surveillance, film taken on early Australian Antarctic research expeditions, recordings of John Curtin's war-time speeches, and tapes of the Stolen Generation inquiry. The NAA started a fundraising campaign after the government initially failed to commit to funding the project, but in June 2021 announced that the full amount would be provided, in order to digitise the at-risk collection by hiring additional archivists and enhancing its cybersecurity. The pledge of the full amount allows for a faster schedule to digitise the at-risk material, with a completion date of four years away rather than seven.

Governance
As ruled in the Archives Act 1983, the National Archives reports to its Minister, the Attorney-General. Like all government agencies, it is accountable to the Australian Parliament. The National Archives of Australia Advisory Council provides advice to the Minister responsible for the Archives and the Director-General.

National Directors 

 1944–68 – Ian MacLean, Chief Archivist
 1968–70 – Keith Penny, Chief Archivist
 1970–71 – Keith Pearson, Director, Commonwealth Archives Office
 1971–75 – John Dunner, Director, Commonwealth Archives Office
 1975–84 – Robert Neale, Director-General, Australian Archives
 1984–89 – Brian Cox, Director-General, Australian Archives
 1990–2000 – George Nichols, Director-General, Australian Archives/National Archives of Australia
 2000–03 – Anne-Marie Schwirtlich, acting Director-General, National Archives of Australia
 2003–11 – Ross Gibbs, Director-General, National Archives of Australia
 2011–Jan 2012 – Stephen Ellis, acting Director-General, National Archives of Australia
 2012–2021 – David Fricker, Director-General, National Archives of Australia
 2022–present – Simon Froude, Director-General, National Archives of Australia

Council

2020–2021 

 Dr Denver Beanland (Chair)
 Jade Balfour
Anne Henderson
Professor John Williams
Dr Phil Robertson
Dr Rosemary Laing
Suzanne Hampel
Professor (Emeritus) Sally Walker
 Kevin Andrews MP
 Senator Kim Carr

See also 
 List of national archives
 Palace letters
 Xena (software)

References

External links 

 National Archives of Australia
 History of the NAA
 Archives Act 1983, at ComLaw
 Documenting a Democracy
 Australian Prime Ministers website
 Discovering Anzacs
 Access to archives under the Archives Act

 
Archives in Australia
Commonwealth Government agencies of Australia
Buildings and structures in Canberra
1961 establishments in Australia